The Substitute 2: School's Out is a 1998 straight-to-DVD action-crime-thriller film directed by Steven Pearl and starring Treat Williams as Carl Thomasson (later spelled Karl in the sequels), a mercenary who masquerades as a teacher in order to enter a tough urban school and wreak his revenge upon his brother's killer.

The film has very little connection to The Substitute, other than Joey Six (protagonist Jonathan Shale's only surviving mercenary in the first film, this time portrayed by Angel David instead of Raymond Cruz) aiding Thomasson during the course of the movie. A reference early in the film indicates, through a photograph and short conversation between Thomasson and Joey Six, that Shale and Jane Hetzko (Shale's girlfriend) had married and now teach in foreign nations as part of the Peace Corps. It is also noted that Shale and Thomasson had served in the Army, as well as worked as mercenaries together.

Plot
Randall Thomasson is gunned down while attempting to stop a carjacking. His brother, Karl, attends his funeral and attempts to make amends with his niece, who is angry that Karl never contacted her or her father.

Karl decides to investigate his brother's death, and goes undercover as a teacher, facing cynical and reluctant faculty, violent and disruptive students, and a system that—to Karl's eyes—has become broken from the inside, all while attempting to protect his teenage niece.

Recruiting Joey Six, and a rather unorthodox janitor, Thomasson turns the school into an after-hours battleground, fighting against well-armed gang members, and—eventually—the school's auto-repair teacher (B. D. Wong), a former mercenary who is also involved in the gang's chop-shop operation.

Cast
 Treat Williams as Karl Thomasson
 B.D. Wong as Warren Drummond
 Angel David as Joey 'Six'
 Michael Michele as Kara LaVelle
 Larry Gilliard Jr. as Dontae
 Susan May Pratt as Anya Thomasson
 Edoardo Ballerini as Danny Bramson
 Daryl Edwards as Jonathan Bartee
 Paul Lazar as Mack Weathers
 Eugene Byrd as Mace
 Shawn McLean as Badass
 Guru as 'Little B'
 Christopher Cousins as Randall Thomasson
 Chuck Jeffreys as Willy
 Owen Stadele as Joel
 Camille Gaston as Keyshawn
 Antonio David Lyons as Sodaboy

External links 
 

1998 films
Films about educators
Films about school violence
1998 action thriller films
1998 crime thriller films
Hood films
American action thriller films
American crime action films
American crime thriller films
American sequel films
Direct-to-video sequel films
Films scored by Joe Delia
Films set in Brooklyn
Films set in New York City
The Substitute films
1990s English-language films
1990s American films